IIT Delhi, officially Indian Institute of Technology Delhi, is a public institute of technology located in New Delhi, India. It is one of the 23 Indian Institutes of Technology created to be Centres of Excellence for India's training, research and development in science, engineering and technology.        

Established in 1961, was formally inaugurated in August 1961 by Prof. Humayun Kabir, Minister of Scientific Research & Cultural Affairs. First admissions were made in 1961.The current campus has an area of 320 acres (or 1.3 km2) and is bounded by the Sri Aurobindo Marg on the east, the Jawaharlal Nehru University Complex on the west, the National Council of Educational Research and Training on the south, and the New Ring Road on the north, and flanked by Qutub Minar and the Hauz Khas monuments.

The institute was later decreed in the Institutes of National Importance under the Institutes of Technology Amendment Act, 1963, and accorded the status of a full University with powers to decide its academic policy, conduct its examinations, and award its degrees.

History
The concept of IIT was first introduced by Sh. N.M.Sircar, then a Member of Education on Viceroy's executive council. Following his recommendations, the first Indian Institute of Technology was established in the year 1950 in Kharagpur. In his report, Shri Sircar had suggested that such Institutes should also be started in different parts of the country. The Government having accepted these recommendations of the Sircar Committee decided to establish more Institutes of Technology with the assistance of friendly countries who were prepared to help. The first offer of help came from the USSR who agreed to collaborate in the establishment of an Institute through UNESCO at Bombay. This was followed by the Institutes of Technology at Madras, Kanpur, and Delhi with collaborations with West Germany, the United States, and UK respectively.

H.R.H. Prince Philip, Duke of Edinburgh laid the foundation stone of the college at Hauz Khas on 28 January 1959 during his visit to India. The first admissions were made in 1961. The College of Engineering & Technology was registered as a society on 14 June 1960 under the Societies Registration Act No. XXI of 1860 (Registration No. S1663 of 1960–61). The students were asked to report at the college on 16 August 1961, and the college was formally inaugurated on 17 August 1961 by Humayun Kabir, Minister of Scientific Research & Cultural Affairs. Initially, the college ran in the Kashmiri Gate campus of Delhi College of Engineering (now known as Delhi Technological University) before shifting to its permanent campus in Hauz Khas. The Department of Textile Technology of Delhi College of Engineering was shifted out en-block to mark the beginning of the IIT Delhi at its new campus at Hauz Khas. The college was later accorded the status of a university and was renamed as Indian Institute of Technology Delhi. IIT Delhi celebrated its Golden Jubilee in 2011, and its Diamond Jubilee in 2021.

In 2018, IIT Delhi was one of the first six institutes to be awarded the Institute of Eminence status. According to a government statement issued earlier, these IoEs will have greater autonomy in that they will be able to admit foreign students up to 30% of the admitted students and recruit foreign faculty up to 25% of the faculty strength with enhanced research funding.

Campus

Main Campus

The primary campus of IIT Delhi is located in Hauz Khas, South Delhi, with Sonipat and Jhajjar being the two satellite campuses. The campus is also close to other educational institutions such as the Jawaharlal Nehru University, Indian Institute of Foreign Trade, All India Institute of Medical Sciences, National Institute of Fashion Technology, National Council of Educational Research and Training (NCERT) and Indian Statistical Institute.

The IIT-D campus is divided into four zones:
 Student Residential Zone
 Faculty and Staff Residential Zone
 Student Recreational Area, that includes the Student Activity Center (SAC), football stadium, cricket ground, basketball courts, hockey field, lawn tennis courts and swimming pool
 Academic Zone that includes department offices, lecture theatres, libraries, and workshops.
The student residential zone consists of 14 student hostels which are named after the mountain ranges of India. It is divided into two main sectors— one for the 11 boys hostels and another for the 3 girls hostels.

Sonipat campus
Initially announced in 2012, the new IITD-Sonipat campus was unveiled in April 2018 by the Chief Minister of Haryana at the Technopark at Rajiv Gandhi Education City, Sonipat. The Technopark, of which this campus is part of, itself was established at a cost of INR175 crore (1.75 billion). The Campus in Sonipat focuses on Executive and Faculty Development programs for the engineering and technical colleges of Haryana state, as well as design and development of advanced technology, incubate more start-ups and promote industry collaboration.

Facilities include research & development labs set up by corporations jointly with IIT Delhi, business incubators, Impact Lab for Path, a global health innovation hub, high-end central research facility and Centre of Excellence in Smart manufacturing, training centers, and convention facilities. It can incubate and house 100 startups with residential facilities.

Jhajjar campus
IITD-Jhajjar campus is located next to the AIIMS-Delhi's Jhajjar campus at Badsa village in Jhajjar district of Haryana. IIT-Delhi and AIIMS are jointly setting up a biomedical research park at this campus, including a joint Ph.D. supervision program and provision for adjunct faculty. IITD-Jhajjar is funded by the IITD and managed by the Foundation for Innovation and Technology Transfer (FITT).

Organisation and administration

Governance

All IITs follow the same organization structure which has the President of India as visitor at the top of the hierarchy. Directly under the president is the IIT Council. Under the IIT Council is the board of governors of each IIT.
Under the board of governors is the director, who is the chief academic and executive officer of the IIT. Under the director, in the organizational structure, comes the deputy director. Under the director and the deputy director, come the deans, heads of departments, registrar.

Externally funded schools
IIT Delhi has four externally funded schools functioning as a part of the institute:
 Bharti School of Telecommunication Technology and Management
 Amar Nath and Shashi Khosla School of Information Technology
 Kusuma School of Biological Sciences
 Centre of Excellence in Cyber Systems and Information Assurance
School of Public Policy
School of Artificial Intelligence
School of Interdisciplinary Research

Academics
IIT Delhi offers Bachelor of Technology programs in various fields as well as dual degree B.Tech. - M.Tech. programs. Admission to these programs is done through Joint Entrance Examination – Advanced.

IIT Delhi also offers postgraduate programs awarding M.Tech. (by coursework), M.S. (by research), M.Sc., M. Des., MBA (DMS Delhi) under various departments and centres. The admission to M.Tech. program is carried out mainly based on Graduate Aptitude Test in Engineering (GATE). M.Des ( Master of Design ) admissions are through Common Entrance Examination for Design (CEED), M.Sc. admissions are through Joint Admission Test for Masters (JAM) and MBA admissions are through Common Admission Test (CAT).

In March 2018, IIT Delhi formally inaugurated a new Department of Design to bolster Research and Education on Design. The 25-year-old design course was earlier functioning under the ambit of IDDC (Instrument Design and Development Centre). IIT Delhi would be starting the B.Des (Bachelor of Design) program from the academic year 2022–2023.

Rankings

Internationally, IIT Delhi was ranked 174 in the world by the QS World University Rankings of 2022 and 46 in Asia. It was ranked in the 701–800 band in the Academic Ranking of World Universities ranking in 2023.

In India, IIT Delhi was ranked second with a score of 88.12 in the National Institutional Ranking Framework (NIRF) engineering ranking for 2022, third in the research ranking and fourth overall. Outlook India ranked it second in the "Outlook-ICARE Rankings 2022: India's Top 25 Government Engineering Colleges" ranking, while India Today ranked it first among engineering colleges in India in 2022.

Student life

Cultural and non-academic activities 
The institute organises its annual cultural fest Rendezvous, originally started in 1976. It is a four-day-long event held in October every year. In the 2019 version, Rendezvous hosted 280+ events, 15,000+ participants and 200+ artists from more than 25 countries.

Tryst, a technical fest organised by the student community of IIT Delhi is North India's largest science, technological and management festival. With 75+ events, Tryst attracts nearly 40,000+ students all across the nation.

Office of Career Services
The Office of Career Services (OCS), previously known as the Training and Placement (T&P) Unit, had the primary aim of helping students to find a job upon graduation. Its role has evolved with OCS focusing on year – round activities to provide career counseling, interview preparation and talks to expose students to the multitude of opportunities available.

Student bodies

There are a number of student bodies in IIT Delhi, each with its own set of responsibilities. The highest student body in IIT Delhi is the Student Affairs Council (SAC).

Student Affairs Council (SAC) 
The Students Affairs Council is the apex student body of IIT-Delhi. The primary objective of SAC is to look after all the issues/problems concerning the students of IIT Delhi. The administrative decisions related to student affairs and infrastructure related issues are also addressed by SAC. The grievances and suggestions of the students are directed to the concerned administration for redressal through the SAC framework. SAC consists of the various boards of IIT Delhi and other committees.

Student boards included under the SAC are listed below:

Board for Student Welfare (BSW) 
As the name suggests BSW works for the welfare of all the students of IITD. The BSW shall organize welfare activities from time to time and look into other aspects of student welfare. The BSW shall provide financial aid to the needy students as per the decided rules. BSW has the responsibility of organising Speranza, the annual youth festival of IIT Delhi.

The board monitors the sports domain of the institute. It is responsible for maintaining the sports grounds of different sports, conducting Inter Hostel sports competition, ensure and manage the participation of IIT Delhi in Inter IIT Sports Meet (the annual sports event of all the IITs). Apart from this, BSA is also responsible for conducting Sportech, the annual Sports Festival of IIT Delhi.

The other student council is the Co-curricular and Academic Interaction Council (CAIC). which deals with the academic and co-curricular activities of the students. There are 45 student representatives to the CAIC: 22 from the UG students and 23 from the PG students, apart from 2 representatives from each co-curricular body. The co-curricular activities under the CAIC are:
 Robotics Club
 Entrepreneurship Development Cell
 Technocracy (consisting of Astronomy Club, Economics Club, Electronics Club, and Tech Workshops)
 Automobile Club (consisting of Formula SAE, Mini Baja, and HPV)
The annual technical festival of IIT Delhi, Tryst is organised by the CAIC.

Technical organisations

ACM Student Chapter 
The Association for Computing Machinery is an educational and scientific society which works with the motto of "Advancing Computing as a Science and Profession". The IIT Delhi Student Chapter of the ACM was established in 2002 to address the needs of the IIT Delhi computing community. The goal of the chapter is to create interest among the students for computer science, apart from what they learn during the course work. The chapter organises workshops and talks on different subjects by speakers who are well known in their area. These talks give students opportunities to learn about advanced research subjects. Apart from these, some non-technical activities are also organised. The IIT Delhi Chapter won the ACM Student Chapter Excellence Award for its Outstanding Activities during 2009–10. In 2012, the team of Rudradev Basak, Nikhil Garg, and Pradeep Mathias of IIT Delhi, achieved India's best ever rank at the ACM ICPC World Finals, by finishing 18th

Technology Business Incubation Unit (TBIU), IIT Delhi 
The Technology Business Incubator Unit (TBIU) is the incubation cell at IIT Delhi. It has been in active operation in the institute since the year 2000. The objective of the TBIU is primarily to promote partnership with new technology entrepreneurs and start-up companies. Every year, startups are selected into the incubation program and provided support to create innovative technology companies.

See also
 Indian Institutes of Technology
 List of IIT Delhi people
 List of universities in India
 Universities and colleges in India
 Education in India

References

External links

 

 
Institutes of Eminence
Engineering colleges in Delhi
Delhi
Educational institutions established in 1961
1961 establishments in Delhi